André Milhoux (born 9 December 1928) is a former racing driver from Belgium.  He participated in one Formula One World Championship Grand Prix, the 1956 German Grand Prix on 5 August 1956, but had to retire after 15 laps due to an engine failure. He scored no championship points.

Complete Formula One World Championship results
(key)

References

1928 births
Living people
Belgian racing drivers
Belgian Formula One drivers
24 Hours of Le Mans drivers
Gordini Formula One drivers
24 Hours of Spa drivers
20th-century Belgian people